The President's Trophy Boat Race is a popular boat race held on the Ashtamudi lake in Kollam city on 1 November every year. The day marks the birth of the Indian state of Kerala, known as Kerala Piravi. This is the most popular of the races to be held during the season of the harvest festival, Onam, in Autumn on Ashtamudi Lake in Kollam. There would be races in five categories, namely Chundan Vallam (snake-boats), two grades of Veppu Vallam, and two grades of Iruttukuthi Vallam. Sixteen snake-boats would compete in four heats. The trophy had been instituted in the name of the President of India. President of India will be present to witness the race and would also give away the trophy and cash prize to the winning team. The race will become a part of Kerala's IPL-model boat race league from 2019 onward. The Government of Kerala is planning to make President's Trophy Boat Race as the finishing event of Champions’ Boat League.

About the event

Kollam is a miniature of Kerala in all its pomp and pride in tourism map. The Ashtamudi Lake – beautiful calm water spread with enchanting greenery on the blanks. It is also gifted with unique representative features - sea, lakes plains, monuments, rivers, streams, backwaters, forest, and vast green fields.

The venue is at Gateway of Ashtamudi. The race will start from the water column near Thevally Palace and finishing point will be front of the house boat terminal. The water body having 1250 m long in between these two points is scheduled as the Track for the race.

As the oarsmen throw their oars in unison to the fast paced rhythm of the vanchipattu (Song of the Boatmen), the huge black crafts slice through pristine race course of Ashtamudi Lake to a spectacular finish. Hundreds of spectators, including tourists from abroad, thronging the lake front, erupts out of joy.

Boat race is telecasted live in DD National and DD Malayalam.

Champions - first edition
Winners of the first edition of President's Trophy Boat Race - Sree Ganeshan Chundan(St. Francis Boat Club, Kollam).  Runner up - Devas Chundan (Jesus Boat Club, Kollam).

Her Excellency the Honorable President of India, Smt.Pratibha Devisingh Patil inaugurated first edition of President's Trophy boat race.

Trophies and prize money

The gold-plated trophy and rupees 10 lakhs cash award.

Winners

Patrons
 Chief Patron: Hon. Chief Minister of Kerala
 Chairman: District Collector of Kollam
 General Convener: District Magistrate of Kollam
 Mayor, Corporation of Kollam

Other notable boat races in Kerala
 Nehru Trophy Boat Race
 Aranmula Uthrattadi Vallamkali
 Kumarakom Boat Race
 Kallada Boat Race

Other notable events in city 
 Kollam pooram
 Kollam Beach

References

 The Hindu News Paper KOLLAM, 10 August 2011
 The Hindu News Paper KOLLAM, 9 August 2011
 The Hindu News Paper KOLLAM, 17 July 2011
 http://www.keralatourism.org/gothuruth-boat-race.php

External links

 Official President's Trophy Boat Race Website

Culture of Kollam
Boat races in Kerala
Festivals in Kollam district
Sport in Kollam
2011 establishments in Kerala
Recurring sporting events established in 2011